The AWH Polytechnic college (AWHPTC),is situated in Kuttikkattoor, 13 km away from Kozhikode, Kerala.The college under Department of Technical Education Kerala and affiliated by AICTE.

Location
6 km away from Government Medical College, Kozhikode

History
AWH Polytechnic College was established in 2005 by the Association for the Welfare of the Handicapped (A.W.H)  as a self-financing colleges. Initially the college was under the Department of Technical Education, Kerala and affiliated by AICTE.

Departments
 Electronics and Communication Engineering
 Biomedical engineering
 Mechanical engineering
 Tool and die engineering

References

External links
Official Website
Director of Technical Education

Colleges in Kerala
Kozhikode